Ferri is an Italian surname. Notable people with the surname include:

 Alessandra Ferri (born 1963), Italian prima ballerina assoluta
 Alessandro Ferri (1921–2003),  Italian professional football player
 Antonio Ferri (1912–1975), Italian scientist
 Baldassare Ferri (1610–1680), Italian castrato singer
 Blaine Ferri (born 2000), American soccer player
 Ciro Ferri (1634–1689), Italian Baroque sculptor and painter
 Clodoveo Ferri (born 1947), Italian clinical researcher 
 Daniele Ferri (born 1992) Italian footballer
 Diamond Ferri (born 1981), player of American and Canadian football
 Elda Ferri, Italian film producer 
 Enrico Ferri (1856–1929), Italian criminologist and socialist
 Flávio Ferri,  Brazilian retired soccer forward
 Frank Ferri (born 1954), American Democratic politician in the Rhode Island House Representatives  
 Gabriella Ferri (1942–2004), Italian singer of popular music
 Gallieno Ferri (1929–2016), Italian comic book artist and illustrator
 Gesualdo Francesco Ferri (1728-1788), Italian painter, active mainly in Florence
 Giacomo Ferri (born 1959),  Italian football manager and former defender player
 Guy Ferri (1922–1991), United States diplomat and United Nations official 
 Héctor Ferri (born 1968), retired footballer from Ecuador 
 Irene Ferri (born 1972), Italian actress
 Jacopo Ferri (born 1995), Italian football player
 Jakup Ferri (1832–1879), leader of Albanian irregulars 
 Janice Ferri Esser, American writer 
 Jean-Yves Ferri (born 1959), French writer, designer and colourist of comics
 Jean-Michel Ferri (born 1969), French footballer
 Jordan Ferri (born 1992), French professional footballer 
 Lambert Ferri (1250–1300), trouvère and cleric at the Benedictine monastery at Saint-Léonard, Pas-de-Calais
 Liana Ferri, Italian screenwriter, script supervisor and occasional film actress
 Linda Ferri (born 1957), Italian author and screenwriter
 Luca Ferri (born 1980), Italian footballer  
 Luigi Ferri (1826–1895), Italian philosopher
 Karine Ferri (born 1982),  French television presenter and model
 Mario Ferri (born 1982), Italian-Canadian community organizer, activist and municipal 
 Mário Guimarães Ferri (1918–1985), Brazilian academic
 Marta Ferri (born 1984), Italian fashion designer
 Mauro Ferri (1920–2015), Italian politician and judge
 Michael Brini Ferri (born 1989), Italian footballer 
 Michele Ferri (born 1981), Italian footballer 
 Patrice Ferri, retired French association football defender 
 Paul Ferri, founder and general partner of Matrix Partners, a venture capital firm
 Pierre Ferri (1904–1993), French stockbroker and conservative politician 
 Riccardo Ferri (born 1963), Italian footballer
 Roberto Ferri (born 1978), Italian artist and painter
 Romolo Ferri (1928–2015), Italian Grand Prix motorcycle road racer
 Ron Ferri (1932–2019), American digital artist

See also
 13326 Ferri, main-belt asteroid
 Ferri Abolhassan (born 1964), German Doctor of Computer Science
 Ferro (disambiguation)
 Ferrie (disambiguation)
 Ferry (disambiguation)

Italian-language surnames